Danian in Iran may refer to:
 Danian, Fars (دنيان - Danīān)
 Danian, Markazi (دانيان - Dānīān)